Asa Stower House is a historic home located at Queensbury, Warren County, New York.  It was a -story, five-by-two-bay, 2-story, side-gabled residence, with a rear ell wing and slate roof in a Federal style.  It was built in four phases: a pre-1806 original frame residence incorporated into the rear ell; the c. 1806 main block; renovations dated to about 1850 that added Greek Revival elements; and the Italianate-style front porches added about 1870.  It is located adjacent to the Sanford House.

It was added to the National Register of Historic Places in 2006.

References

Houses on the National Register of Historic Places in New York (state)
Federal architecture in New York (state)
Houses completed in 1806
Houses in Warren County, New York
National Register of Historic Places in Warren County, New York